Pruśce  is a village in the administrative district of Gmina Rogoźno, within Oborniki County, Greater Poland Voivodeship, in west-central Poland.

References

Villages in Oborniki County